Saeid Azizian (born 18 December 1965 in Tehran, Iran) is a retired Iranian football goalkeeper and a current coach.

Club career

Esteghlal
He joined Esteghlal academy in 1984 and was promoted to the first team in 1988 by then-coach Gholam Hossein Mazloumi. He played one season for the club but joined Esteghlal's rival Persepolis in the next season.

Persepolis
He signed a two years contract before the start of the 1989–90 season with Persepolis. His excellent performance was praised by many coaches and he was invited in the same year to the Iran national football team but after his violent injury occurred in a match in Qods League, he was far away from football for more than one year. He announced his retirement at the end of the season due to his injury.

International career
While playing for Persepolis he was invited by Ali Parvin to the national team and has two caps. He made his debut in a friendly match against Poland. The other match he played was against USSR.

Coaching career
After retiring he returned to Persepolis as a goalkeeping coach when Afshin Ghotbi became the team's head coach. He continued with their new head coach Afshin Peyrovani, but after Peyrovani resigned and Nelo Vingada took over as the club head coach, Azizian's contract was terminated. He became the goalkeeping coach of Shahin Bushehr in 2010 and worked with that team until the end of the season. After Yahya Golmohammadi became Persepolis' head coach, Azizian returned to his first coaching career on 2 February 2013. He is currently goalkeeping coach of Padideh, after working with Saba Qom and Mes Kerman.

Honors
Persepolis
Iranian Football League:
Runner-up (1): 1989–90
Hazfi Cup:
Winner (1): 1990–91

References

1965 births
Living people
Sportspeople from Tehran
Iranian footballers
Esteghlal F.C. players
Persepolis F.C. players
Persepolis F.C. non-playing staff
Association football goalkeepers
Iran international footballers